Diaz Ray Wright (born 22 February 1998) is an English professional footballer who plays as a midfielder, most recently for  club Colchester United.

The son of former Ipswich Town and Southampton midfielder Jermaine Wright and brother to Drey Wright, Wright has progressed through the Academy since joining the club at under-13 level, before making his debut in August 2016. He joined Needham Market on loan in October 2017, and Braintree Town on loan in March 2018, helping the club to promotion through the National League South play-offs in May 2018. He joined Dagenham & Redbridge on loan in December 2019 and Welling United in January 2020. Wright was released by Colchester in May 2021.

Career
Born in Greenwich, London, Wright is the son of former Ipswich Town and Southampton midfielder Jermaine Wright and brother to Drey Wright. Wright joined Colchester United's Academy at under-13 level and has progressed through the age groups. He signed a one-year professional development contract with Colchester in June 2016. He was named on the first-team bench for the first time on 30 August 2016 for Colchester's EFL Trophy trip to Crawley Town. He made his debut in the game, replacing Tom Lapslie after 62-minutes of the 1–0 defeat.

On 3 July 2017, Wright signed a new one-year contract with Colchester United.

Wright joined Isthmian League Premier Division side Needham Market on loan on 16 October 2017, initially signing until the end of November. He made his debut on 17 October in a 1–0 defeat at Hendon, before scoring his first goal on 11 November in a 3–1 FA Trophy qualifying round defeat to Brentwood Town.

In March 2018, Wright joined National League South side Braintree Town on loan for one month. After making his debut in a 2–2 draw with Wealdstone, Braintree manager Brad Quinton praised Wright's maturity and hoped that the team could hold on to him until the end of the season. He helped the club to promotion in the National League play-offs in May 2018 as he scored the winning goal in a penalty shoot-out against Hampton & Richmond Borough.

Wright signed a new one-year contract with Colchester in May 2018.

On 1 September 2018, Wright made his English Football League debut and his first appearance of the season for Colchester when he appeared as a substitute for Brandon Comley in their 3–1 League Two win against Cheltenham Town.

Wright joined National League side Dagenham & Redbridge in December 2019, initially until 6 January 2020. He made his debut in Dagenham's extra time win over Sutton United in the FA Trophy, playing the full 120 minutes.

After his Dagenham loan, Wright joined Welling United alongside Colchester teammate Cameron James on loan for one month on 10 January 2020. He made his debut the next day in a 1–0 defeat to Wealdstone. He scored his first goal for the club in a 3–2 victory against Hungerford Town on 18 January. His loan was extended for a further month on 4 March.

After making only 14 first team appearances for Colchester in five years, with his last in March 2019, Wright was released by the club in May 2021.

Career statistics

Honours
Braintree Town
National League South play-offs: 2017–18

References

External links

1998 births
Living people
Footballers from Greenwich
English footballers
Association football midfielders
Colchester United F.C. players
Needham Market F.C. players
Braintree Town F.C. players
Dagenham & Redbridge F.C. players
Welling United F.C. players
Isthmian League players
National League (English football) players
English Football League players